Cwm Clydach is the name of a Site of Special Scientific Interest in Carmarthenshire, Wales. The site is located 4 kilometres from the coast and the town of Kidwelly.

The site is of special interest for its plant population of lichens and ferns. Cwm Clydach is a deep ravine cut into a low ridge sandstones, popularly known as the "Farewell Rock".

See also 

 List of SSSIs in Carmarthenshire

References 

Sites of Special Scientific Interest in Carmarthen & Dinefwr